Zhemgang is a town in Zhemgang District, Bhutan. It is the capital (dzongkhag thromde) of the district, and is located in Trong Gewog.

In 2005, Zhemgang had a population of 2,332. The post code of Zhemgang is 34001.

References

Populated places in Bhutan
Zhemgang District